was a town located in Minamiaizu District, Fukushima, Japan.  It was the largest town in Minamiaizu District and in the summer held the locally famous Gion Festival, not to be confused with the Tobata Gion Festival in Kyushu.

As of 2003, the town had an estimated population of 13,142 and a density of 37.51 persons per km². The total area was 350.34 km².

On March 20, 2006, Tajima, along with the villages of Ina, Nangō and Tateiwa (all from Minamiaizu District), was merged to create the town of Minamiaizu.

Climate

References

External links
 Minamiaizu official website 

Dissolved municipalities of Fukushima Prefecture
Minamiaizu, Fukushima